Feodosiysky Uyezd (Феодосийский уезд) was one of the subdivisions of the Taurida Governorate of the Russian Empire. It was situated in the southeastern part of the governorate, in eastern Crimea. Its administrative centre was Feodosiya.

Demographics
At the time of the Russian Empire Census of 1897, Feodosiysky Uyezd had a population of 24,096. Of these, 46.8% spoke Russian, 18.8% Crimean Tatar, 11.4% Yiddish, 7.7% Ukrainian, 5.3% Greek, 3.7% Armenian, 2.5% Polish, 1.3% German, 0.6% Belarusian, 0.5% Turkish, 0.3% Latvian, 0.2% Italian, 0.2% Bulgarian, 0.2% French, 0.1% Moldovan or Romanian and 0.1% Czech as their native language.

References

 
Uyezds of Taurida Governorate
Taurida Governorate